Jackie Fields (Jacob Finkelstein, February 9, 1908 – June 3, 1987) was an American professional boxer who won the World Welterweight Championship twice. Statistical boxing website BoxRec lists Fields as the #19 ranked welterweight of all-time. Fields was elected to the United Savings-Helms Hall of Boxing Fame in 1972, the International Jewish Sports Hall of Fame in 1979, the World Boxing Hall of Fame in 1987, and the International Boxing Hall of Fame in 2004.

Early life and career
Jackie Fields, who was Jewish, was born Jacob Finkelstein on Maxwell Street, in Chicago, Illinois, on February 9, 1908.  His father was a Jewish Russian immigrant who worked as a butcher. In 1921, when he was 14 years old, he and his family moved to Los Angeles, California.  He attended Lincoln High School, but dropped out.

Some of his initial boxing instruction came from the legendary Black boxing trainer and former lightweight boxer Jack Blackburn, who would later train Joe Louis.  When his family moved to Los Angeles in 1921, Fields continued boxing at Jack Dempsey's Gym. He boxed as an exceptional amateur for the Los Angeles Sporting Club, under the instruction of George Blake, a master trainer who recognized Jackie's potential as early as the age of thirteen.  An exceptional boxer in Blake's stable, future world flyweight champion Fidel LaBarba, sparred with the young Fields after he arrived in Los Angeles and would spar with him on other occasions to improve his technique and speed.

As a young fighter, Fields was told by promoters that his birth name presented "the wrong image" because Jews weren't considered tough, physical guys. In looking for a suitable ring name, Finkelstein selected "Fields" after Chicago businessman and philanthropist Marshall Field; "Jackie" was selected as an Americanized form of his first name, Jacob.

Amateur career
Over the course of Field's amateur career, he participated in 54 fights, winning 51 of them. Fields won a gold medal in featherweight boxing at the age of only 16 in the 1924 Summer Olympics in Paris, becoming the youngest boxer to ever receive such an honor.

Olympic results (1924)
 Defeated Mossy Doyle (Ireland) PTS
 Defeated Olaf Hansen (Norway) PTS
 Defeated Carlos Abarca (Chile) PTS
 Defeated Pedro Quartucci (Argentina) PTS
 Defeated Joseph Salas (USA) PTS

Professional career

Early career loss to Jimmy McLarnin, 1925
Intrigued by a $5000 purse, but acting against the better judgement of skilled matchmakers, Fields took on the far more experienced Jimmy McLarnin, on November 12, 1925.  With only six fights and nine months of professional boxing to his credit, Fields lost badly in a second-round knockout at Olympic Auditorium in Los Angeles.  McLarnin floored him four times in the brief match, with Fields suffering a broken jaw in the humiliating defeat.  Dubbing him the "future lightweight champion", the Los Angeles Times recognized the mastery of McLarnin, who carefully studied Fields's style, letting him take the lead in the first, before knocking him down three times in the second with successive overhand rights. Never having been down before, Fields unwisely rose immediately from his first knockdown, only to be knocked to the canvas again. In his fourth knockdown, he remained on the canvas for the full count.  Learning from the experience, and listening more carefully to his handlers, Fields never lost a match by knockout again.

Fields suffered a rare early career loss to Jewish boxer, and former world featherweight champion Louis "Kid" Kaplan on June 15, 1927 in a ten round points decision at New York's Polo Grounds.  Kaplan's two handed attack was unrelenting, and though the taller Fields scored with straight left jabs and a rapid right cross, they did not come frequently enough to gain a margin in points.  Kaplan poured far more blows into Fields, taking the decision.

He defeated Jewish boxing great, reigning world junior lightweight champion, Mushy Callahan in a non-title bout on November 22, 1927.  Callahan was nearly knocked out in the second, ninth, and tenth, having difficulty remaining on his feet.  Fields continually poured rights and lefts to the body and face, and was credited with six of the ten rounds.  Callahan, possibly lacking conditioning, was returning to the ring after an illness of several months.

In a rare early-career loss, Fields dropped a ten-round unanimous decision to reigning world lightweight champion Sammy Mandell on February 3, 1928.  Fields led the first few rounds with a strong body attack, but Mandell found his range in the third with long lunging lefts to Fields's left eye.  Fields's injury put him on the defensive, and in the late rounds he was forced to do more infighting and clinching.  He tried to turn the tables in the ninth, but it was too late to even the points differential. In their first meeting on April 4, 1927, before a disappointing crowd of only 5,000, Fields had fared far better against Mandell in a twelve-round newspaper decision at Wrigley Field in Los Angeles, winning handily according to the Los Angeles Times. The paper awarded Fields eight of the ten rounds, with only two to Mandell.  Fields staggered Mandell in the sixth with an overhand right to the jaw.  The no-decision bout, however, was not for a title and Fields was over the lightweight limit, letting Mandell walk away with his championship intact. The San Francisco Examiner believed Mandell had won by the slightest of margins, but noted that the younger and less experienced Fields easily took the second and tenth rounds with harder punching, though he failed to follow up his advantage.

NBA World welterweight champion, March 1929
Fields won the world welterweight title in 1929 and 1932.
He defeated Young Jack Thompson before 9,000 fans on March 25, 1929 in a ten round unanimous decision in Chicago for the vacant NBA welterweight title.  The Akron Beacon Journal wrote that Fields was "unstoppable in his offensive, unswerving in his determination, and completely the master of his foe".  In the first two rounds, Fields nearly knocked out Thompson.  Thompson courageously remained on his feet throughout the bout, repeatedly trying to throw his signature right cross, though he usually missed.  Fields blocked a number of Thompson's blows with his gloves and forearms, and stopped a few in mid-air. His best and most frequent blows came from left handed jabs and hooks.  In the third, Thompson made a brief showing when he scored with a few vicious right crosses, but he failed to carry his momentum into the next round.  The eighth was interrupted by a riot that spilled into the ring, and the fighting was more even in the last two rounds with both fighters exhausted.  The tenth found Thompson trying to score a knockout but most of his blows were blocked by Fields, who kept the round even.  Fields won decisively and was awarded seven of the ten rounds with only one to Thompson and two even.

Prior to the bout, the world welterweight title had become vacant as the National Boxing Association stripped Joe Dundee of the title.  California, and the National Boxing Association, but not the powerful New York State Athletic Commission (NYSAC), officially recognized Fields as the champion on April 19, 1929.  The NYSAC would not recognize Fields as champion until July when he faced Dundee.

On July 25, 1929 Fields faced Joe Dundee before a large crowd of 25,000 in a unifying match for the welterweight championship in Detroit. Fields was awarded the fight in the second round after Dundee, having been knocked down four times, delivered a foul blow while still down which left Fields incapable of continuing the fight. Dundee claimed that the foul was unintentional. Fields stated he believed Dundee, but noted that it was the only bout he had ever won on a foul.  The win gave Fields unified recognition as world welterweight champion.

Fields defeated black boxer William "Guerilla" Jones, future world "Colored" welterweight champion, on October 21, 1929 in San Francisco before a crowd of 10,000.  In an action filled ten rounds, Jones took the early lead and rocked Fields several times with straight rights to the jaw, but Fields's stamina and aggressiveness wore Jones down in the closing rounds.  Fields's clearly took the ninth and tenth, and had a clear edge in five rounds, but could not defend against repeated rights from Jones throughout the bout.  In a match two months later on December 13, referee Joe O'Connor stopped the bout, complaining that Jones was not giving his "usual exhibition" and ordered the promoter to pay the purses for both fighters.  The Boston Globe felt the fight was legitimate, however, and that Jones's long arms against Fields's desire to fight at close range made the boxers look as though they were trying to avoid coming to blows.

In their fourth meeting, Fields scored a decisive victory in a non-title bout on January 24, 1930 over Vince Dundee, brother of Joe, in a ten round unanimous decision at Chicago Stadium.  Dundee was down four times in the third round, but weathered the full ten, making a comeback in the late rounds.  In the third, Dundee was down once for a count of eight, once for a count of nine, and was saved by the bell as he went down at the end of the round.  Fields was awarded five rounds with only three for Dundee, and two even. Fields had defeated Vince Dundee in three previous ten round points decisions in Chicago on October 2, 1929, and in two meetings in Los Angeles on April 17, and February 14, 1928.

Fields lost his first bout in two years on February 22, 1930, against Young Corbett III in a ten round decision in San Francisco.  Thrown off by his opponent's left hand stance, Fields fell behind in the early rounds and though he came back strongly late in the bout, the referee believed Corbett still held a margin on points.  Since Corbett was two pounds over the welterweight limit, Fields's title was not at stake.  Fields recovered his form two months later with a fourth round TKO against future welterweight champion Tommy Freeman before 8000 fans in Cleveland.  Though Freeman had the edge in the first two rounds, and dazed Fields with a right to the nose in the third, Fields shot a right in the early fourth that cut Freeman's  lip so badly he could not continue.

Loss of the world welter title
Before a crowd of 14,000, Fields lost his NBA world welterweight title to Young Jack Thompson on May 9, 1930 in a fifteen round points decision at Detroit's Olympia Stadium.  Fields piled up a points lead in the early rounds, but Thompson came back with jabs and uppercuts in close fighting that badly wore down the reigning champion. In the seventh, Thompson's rights to the jaw sapped Field's strength, and a straight left opened a cut under his right eye.  In the eleventh, an exhausted Fields clinched frequently.   By the thirteenth, Fields was nearly defenseless, staggering and then falling into the arms of Thompson as the closing bell sounded.  In the fourteenth, Fields made a struggling rally, but Thompson's margin in points was too great.  Thompson was awarded ten of the fifteen rounds by the referee, with only three to Fields.  His victory was considered an upset, as Fields had beaten him in two previous bouts.

He was first married on August 12, 1931. The couple separated in December 1940 and his wife, Martha Lynn, was granted a divorce in May 1944.

In the early 1930s, Fields took on the well known manager Jack Kearns.

Regaining world welter title, Jan 1932
Fields regained the NBA (National Boxing Association) world welterweight championship before an enthusiastic crowd of 11,200, defeating Lou Brouillard in a ten round unanimous decision on January 28, 1932 at Chicago Stadium.  Fields began to take a lead in points in the sixth with vicious lefts and strong sweeping rights that traveled from his hips.  Continuing his attack in the seventh and eighth, he connected with a wide variety of blows, increasing his margin over the reigning champion.  The tenth may have gone to Brouillard by a shade, but Fields had taken a wide points margin and was stronger as the final bell sounded to end the match.

Jackie was involved in a car accident in 1932 outside Louisville, Kentucky, that resulted in a detached retina, a serious injury to his left eye.  Fields had lost most of his real estate fortune in the depression, and was reluctant to leave boxing despite the injury.  Few realized it, but he had only partial vision in the eye, and would fight his next welterweight title bout with his vision impaired.  Subsequent operations failed to restore the eye, and in 1938, he lost it entirely.

Loss of world welter title, Feb 1933

Fields lost his NBA welterweight title on February 22, 1933 against Southpaw Young Corbett III before 15,000 fans in a ten round points decision at Seals Stadium in San Francisco.  He could not stop the leads of Corbett in close in fighting, unable to counter punch soon enough as his opponent waded in.  He failed to box effectively in defense and remained flat footed most of the bout, possibly from fatigue.  The first five rounds belonged to Corbett, though Fields rallied in the sixth with shots to the face and body.  In the seventh, Corbett rocked fields with lefts to the jaw four times at close range, slowing his opponent to a walk.   In the ninth, Fields made his last effort, pounding Corbett around the ring with a two fisted attack.  Unable to overcome a slow start, the referee gave only three rounds to Fields, with six to Corbett.

Three months after losing the welterweight title, Fields won a points decision against Young Peter Jackson in May 1933, and retired from boxing.

Life after boxing
After he lost much of his real estate investments in the depression, Fields lived for a while in the German town section of Philadelphia and worked from 1935 through the 1940s as a salesman for the Wurlitzer Juke Box company and a beer manufacturer, Hannah and Hogg Distilleries.

While in Los Angeles, he appeared in the movies Battling Bunyan (1924), The Prizefighter and the Lady (1933), Big City (1937) and Heavyweight Championship of the World: Muhammad Ali vs. Floyd Patterson (1965).  He coached the boxing scenes in 1934's Personality Kid, appeared in the TV Movie Mohammed Ali vs. Ron Lyle (1975), as well as the TV programs, Wide World of Sports (1969), and Fight of the Week (1961).  His movie entertainment jobs included work as a film editor for MGM and 20th Century Fox.

In 1957, Fields moved to Las Vegas, Nevada and became part owner of the Tropicana Las Vegas.  He eventually sold his interest in the hotel, but stayed on as public relations director.  In the 1960s, he worked as Chairman of the Nevada State Athletic Commission.  In 1965, Fields coached the U.S. boxing team at the 1965 Maccabiah Games.

While in Las Vegas, he married his second wife, a former New York model and Las Vegas on-stage performer, Marjorie Fields, with whom he raised several step children.

Fields died in 1987 at the age of 79 at a nursing home in Las Vegas, Nevada.

In 1996 he was inducted into the Southern California Jewish Sports Hall of Fame.

Professional boxing record
All information in this section is derived from BoxRec, unless otherwise stated.

Official record

All newspaper decisions are officially regarded as “no decision” bouts and are not counted in the win/loss/draw column.

Unofficial record

Record with the inclusion of newspaper decisions in the win/loss/draw column.

See also
List of welterweight boxing champions
List of select Jewish boxers

References

External links
 
 

|-

|-

 https://boxrec.com/media/index.php/The_Ring_Magazine%27s_Annual_Ratings:_Welterweight--1920s
 https://boxrec.com/media/index.php/The_Ring_Magazine%27s_Annual_Ratings:_Welterweight--1930s
 https://titlehistories.com/boxing/na/usa/ny/nysac-wl.html

1908 births
1987 deaths
Boxers from Chicago
Boxers at the 1924 Summer Olympics
Jewish boxers
Olympic gold medalists for the United States in boxing
Olympic boxers of the United States
Medalists at the 1924 Summer Olympics
Jewish American boxers
Welterweight boxers
World welterweight boxing champions
International Boxing Hall of Fame inductees
American male boxers
20th-century American Jews